The 2002 Philadelphia Phillies season was the 120th season in the history of the franchise. The team failed to improve upon their 86-76 record from the previous season. However, this would be their last losing season until 2013.

On June 2, 2002, starting pitcher Robert Person hit two home runs, a grand slam and a 3-run home run in an 18–3 victory over the Montreal Expos.

Offseason
 November 9, 2001: Omar Daal was traded by the Philadelphia Phillies to the Los Angeles Dodgers for Eric Junge and Jesus Cordero (minors).
 January 28, 2002: John Mabry was signed as a free agent with the Philadelphia Phillies.
 January 29, 2002: Ricky Ledée signed as a free agent with the Philadelphia Phillies.

Regular season

Opening Day starters

 Jimmy Rollins – SS
 Doug Glanville – CF
 Bobby Abreu – RF
 Scott Rolen – 3B
 Mike Lieberthal – C
 Travis Lee – 1B
 Pat Burrell – LF
 Marlon Anderson – 2B
 Robert Person – SP

Season standings

National League East

Record vs. opponents

Notable transactions
May 22, 2002: John Mabry was traded by the Philadelphia Phillies to the Oakland Athletics for Jeremy Giambi.
May 26, 2002: Dan Plesac was traded by the Toronto Blue Jays to the Philadelphia Phillies for Cliff Politte.
June 25, 2002: Bruce Aven was traded by the Cleveland Indians to the Philadelphia Phillies for Jeff D'Amico.
July 29, 2002: Scott Rolen was traded by the Philadelphia Phillies with Doug Nickle and cash to the St. Louis Cardinals for Plácido Polanco, Mike Timlin, and Bud Smith.

Draft picks
June 4, 2002: Cole Hamels was drafted by the Philadelphia Phillies in the 1st round (17th pick) of the 2002 amateur draft. Player signed August 28, 2002.

2002 Game Log

|- style="background:#fbb"
| 1 || April 1 || @ Braves || 2–7 || Tom Glavine (1–0) || Robert Person (0–1) || None || 51,638 || 0–1
|- style="background:#bfb"
| 2 || April 3 || @ Braves || 3–1 || Vicente Padilla (1–0) || Kevin Millwood (0–1) || José Mesa (1) || 23,865 || 1–1
|- style="background:#fbb"
| 3 || April 4 || @ Braves || 2–11 || Jason Marquis (1–0) || Terry Adams (0–1) || None || 24,640 || 1–2
|- style="background:#bfb"
| 4 || April 5 || Marlins || 6–2 || Brandon Duckworth (1–0) || Julián Tavárez (0–1) || José Mesa (2) || 50,958 || 2–2
|- style="background:#fbb"
| 5 || April 6 || Marlins || 3–7 || Vladimir Núñez (1–0) || José Santiago (0–1) || None || 18,591 || 2–3
|- style="background:#bfb"
| 6 || April 7 || Marlins || 3–2 (11) || Cliff Politte (1–0) || Braden Looper (0–2) || None || 18,073 || 3–3
|- style="background:#fbb"
| 7 || April 8 || Braves || 1–2 || Kevin Millwood (1–1) || Vicente Padilla (1–1) || John Smoltz (1) || 14,502 || 3–4
|- style="background:#bfb"
| 8 || April 9 || Braves || 7–4 || José Santiago (1–1) || Jason Marquis (1–1) || José Mesa (3) || 13,020 || 4–4
|- style="background:#bfb"
| 9 || April 10 || Braves || 7–5 (11) || Cliff Politte (2–0) || Kerry Ligtenberg (0–1) || None || 14,542 || 5–4
|- style="background:#fbb"
| 10 || April 11 || Braves || 2–6 || Tom Glavine (2–0) || David Coggin (0–1) || Darren Holmes (1) || 14,111 || 5–5
|- style="background:#fbb"
| 11 || April 12 || Reds || 5–8 || Jim Brower (1–0) || Rhéal Cormier (0–1) || Danny Graves (4) || 13,366 || 5–6
|- style="background:#fbb"
| 12 || April 13 || Reds || 2–5 || Joey Hamilton (1–0) || Robert Person (0–2) || Danny Graves (5) || 15,606 || 5–7
|- style="background:#bfb"
| 13 || April 14 || Reds || 3–1 || Vicente Padilla (2–1) || Elmer Dessens (0–3) || José Mesa (4) || 19,195 || 6–7
|- style="background:#fbb"
| 14 || April 16 || @ Marlins || 6–7 || Gary Knotts (2–0) || José Mesa (0–1) || None || 6,107 || 6–8
|- style="background:#bfb"
| 15 || April 17 || @ Marlins || 7–5 || Rhéal Cormier (1–1) || Braden Looper (0–3) || José Mesa (5) || 6,478 || 7–8
|- style="background:#fbb"
| 16 || April 18 || @ Marlins || 7–8 || Vladimir Núñez (2–0) || Ricky Bottalico (0–1) || None || 6,898 || 7–9
|- style="background:#fbb"
| 17 || April 19 || @ Pirates || 4–7 || Sean Lowe (1–0) || Vicente Padilla (2–2) || Mike Williams (7) || 23,321 || 7–10
|- style="background:#fbb"
| 18 || April 20 || @ Pirates || 5–6 || Ron Villone (2–2) || Terry Adams (0–2) || Mike Williams (8) || 18,032 || 7–11
|- style="background:#fbb"
| 19 || April 21 || @ Pirates || 3–9 || Kip Wells (3–1) || Brandon Duckworth (1–1) || None || 18,749 || 7–12
|- style="background:#bfb"
| 20 || April 23 || Padres || 8–5 || Randy Wolf (1–0) || Matt DeWitt (0–1) || José Mesa (6) || 12,138 || 8–12
|- style="background:#fbb"
| 21 || April 24 || Padres || 2–7 || Brian Lawrence (3–1) || Robert Person (0–3) || None || 12,250 || 8–13
|- style="background:#fbb"
| 22 || April 25 || Padres || 4–6 || Bobby J. Jones (2–1) || Rhéal Cormier (1–2) || Trevor Hoffman (7) || 12,249 || 8–14
|- style="background:#fbb"
| 23 || April 26 || @ Rockies || 1–4 || John Thomson (3–2) || Terry Adams (0–3) || José Jiménez (5) || 37,551 || 8–15
|- style="background:#fbb"
| 24 || April 27 || @ Rockies || 6–8 || Shawn Chacón (2–3) || Brandon Duckworth (1–2) || José Jiménez (6) || 38,064 || 8–16
|- style="background:#fbb"
| 25 || April 28 || @ Rockies || 2–4 || Jason Jennings (2–2) || Randy Wolf (1–1) || José Jiménez (7) || 40,357 || 8–17
|- style="background:#fbb"
| 26 || April 29 || @ Giants || 5–8 || Tim Worrell (2–0) || Rhéal Cormier (1–3) || Robb Nen (7) || 35,136 || 8–18
|- style="background:#bfb"
| 27 || April 30 || @ Giants || 8–2 || Vicente Padilla (3–2) || Liván Hernández (4–2) || None || 34,918 || 9–18
|-

|- style="background:#fbb"
| 28 || May 1 || @ Giants || 1–2 || Félix Rodríguez (1–2) || Ricky Bottalico (0–2) || Robb Nen (8) || 36,304 || 9–19
|- style="background:#bfb"
| 29 || May 3 || Rockies || 3–2 || Brandon Duckworth (2–2) || Shawn Chacón (2–4) || José Mesa (7) || 15,257 || 10–19
|- style="background:#bfb"
| 30 || May 4 || Rockies || 6–5 || Héctor Mercado (1–0) || Rick White (0–3) || José Mesa (8) || 16,205 || 11–19
|- style="background:#bfb"
| 31 || May 5 || Rockies || 7–4 || Vicente Padilla (4–2) || Mike Hampton (1–4) || José Mesa (9) || 32,411 || 12–19
|- style="background:#bfb"
| 32 || May 7 || Astros || 7–4 || Carlos Silva (1–0) || Hipólito Pichardo (0–1) || José Mesa (10) || 12,321 || 13–19
|- style="background:#bfb"
| 33 || May 8 || Astros || 5–3 || José Mesa (1–1) || Nelson Cruz (0–3) || None || 13,216 || 14–19
|- style="background:#bfb"
| 34 || May 9 || Astros || 3–1 || Randy Wolf (2–1) || Dave Mlicki (3–4) || José Mesa (11) || 12,476 || 15–19
|- style="background:#bfb"
| 35 || May 10 || Diamondbacks || 4–0 || Vicente Padilla (5–2) || Rick Helling (3–4) || None || 20,504 || 16–19
|- style="background:#fbb"
| 36 || May 11 || Diamondbacks || 5–6 (10) || Byung-hyun Kim (1–0) || José Mesa (1–2) || None || 32,634 || 16–20
|- style="background:#bfb"
| 37 || May 12 || Diamondbacks || 3–1 || Terry Adams (1–3) || Miguel Batista (2–2) || José Mesa (12) || 21,114 || 17–20
|- style="background:#fbb"
| 38 || May 13 || @ Astros || 3–17 || Tim Redding (2–2) || Brandon Duckworth (2–3) || None || 27,324 || 17–21
|- style="background:#fbb"
| 39 || May 14 || @ Astros || 1–5 || Octavio Dotel (1–1) || Randy Wolf (2–2) || Billy Wagner (5) || 26,536 || 17–22
|- style="background:#fbb"
| 40 || May 15 || @ Astros || 2–6 || Carlos Hernández (4–1) || Vicente Padilla (5–3) || None || 27,707 || 17–23
|- style="background:#fbb"
| 41 || May 16 || @ Diamondbacks || 2–4 || Randy Johnson (7–1) || José Santiago (1–2) || Byung-hyun Kim (11) || 32,348 || 17–24
|- style="background:#fbb"
| 42 || May 17 || @ Diamondbacks || 9–12 || Eddie Oropesa (2–0) || Rhéal Cormier (1–4) || Byung-hyun Kim (12) || 35,877 || 17–25
|- style="background:#fbb"
| 43 || May 18 || @ Diamondbacks || 4–5 || Mike Myers (3–1) || José Mesa (1–3) || None || 47,357 || 17–26
|- style="background:#bfb"
| 44 || May 19 || @ Diamondbacks || 4–3 || Randy Wolf (3–2) || José Parra (0–1) || José Mesa (13) || 43,704 || 18–26
|- style="background:#bfb"
| 45 || May 21 || Mets || 4–0 || Vicente Padilla (6–3) || Jeff D'Amico (3–4) || None || 21,090 || 19–26
|- style="background:#bfb"
| 46 || May 22 || Mets || 5–2 || Terry Adams (2–3) || Al Leiter (5–3) || José Mesa (14) || 22,640 || 20–26
|- style="background:#fbb"
| 47 || May 23 || Mets || 0–1 || Scott Strickland (3–2) || José Mesa (1–4) || Armando Benítez (9) || 26,405 || 20–27
|- style="background:#fbb"
| 48 || May 24 || @ Expos || 1–4 || Tomo Ohka (4–3) || Randy Wolf (3–3) || Scott Stewart (1) || 6,091 || 20–28
|- style="background:#fbb"
| 49 || May 25 || @ Expos || 9–13 (10) || T. J. Tucker (3–0) || Héctor Mercado (1–1) || None || 8,370 || 20–29
|- style="background:#fbb"
| 50 || May 26 || @ Expos || 5–6 || Graeme Lloyd (2–2) || Vicente Padilla (6–4) || Scott Stewart (2) || 19,015 || 20–30
|- style="background:#bfb"
| 51 || May 28 || @ Mets || 5–3 || Rhéal Cormier (2–4) || Steve Trachsel (3–5) || José Mesa (15) || 25,939 || 21–30
|- style="background:#fbb"
| 52 || May 29 || @ Mets || 3–4 || Scott Strickland (5–2) || José Santiago (1–3) || Armando Benítez (10) || 37,417 || 21–31
|- style="background:#fbb"
| 53 || May 31 || Expos || 7–8 || Javier Vázquez (3–2) || Brandon Duckworth (2–4) || Scott Stewart (4) || 15,455 || 21–32
|-

|- style="background:#bfb"
| 54 || June 1 || Expos || 8–4 || Vicente Padilla (7–4) || Tony Armas Jr. (5–7) || None || 16,601 || 22–32
|- style="background:#bfb"
| 55 || June 2 || Expos || 18–3 || Robert Person (1–3) || Britt Reames (0–2) || None || 19,223 || 23–32
|- style="background:#fbb"
| 56 || June 4 || Marlins || 0–5 || Hansel Izquierdo (2–0) || Terry Adams (2–4) || None || 14,942 || 23–33
|- style="background:#fbb"
| 57 || June 5 || Marlins || 1–2 || A. J. Burnett (6–5) || Randy Wolf (3–4) || None || 13,039 || 23–34
|- style="background:#bbb"
| – || June 6 || Marlins || colspan=6 | Postponed (rain); Makeup: September 10 as a traditional double-header
|- style="background:#bfb"
| 58 || June 7 || @ Tigers || 11–1 || Vicente Padilla (8–4) || Jeff Weaver (4–8) || None || 25,908 || 24–34
|- style="background:#bfb"
| 59 || June 8 || @ Tigers || 2–1 || Robert Person (2–3) || Danny Patterson (0–2) || José Mesa (16) || 32,295 || 25–34
|- style="background:#bfb"
| 60 || June 9 || @ Tigers || 7–5 || Brandon Duckworth (3–4) || Steve Sparks (3–6) || José Mesa (17) || 21,714 || 26–34
|- style="background:#bfb"
| 61 || June 10 || @ Indians || 3–1 || Terry Adams (3–4) || CC Sabathia (5–5) || José Mesa (18) || 28,440 || 27–34
|- style="background:#fbb"
| 62 || June 11 || @ Indians || 1–5 || Bartolo Colón (8–4) || Randy Wolf (3–5) || Bob Wickman (14) || 30,238 || 27–35
|- style="background:#bfb"
| 63 || June 12 || @ Indians || 7–3 || Vicente Padilla (9–4) || Chad Paronto (0–1) || None || 35,783 || 28–35
|- style="background:#fbb"
| 64 || June 14 || Orioles || 3–7 || B. J. Ryan (1–0) || Ricky Bottalico (0–3) || None || 16,888 || 28–36
|- style="background:#bfb"
| 65 || June 15 || Orioles || 4–3 (10) || Rhéal Cormier (3–4) || Buddy Groom (2–2) || None || 20,634 || 29–36
|- style="background:#fbb"
| 66 || June 16 || Orioles || 2–4 || Travis Driskill (4–0) || Terry Adams (3–5) || Jorge Julio (13) || 41,079 || 29–37
|- style="background:#fbb"
| 67 || June 18 || White Sox || 3–6 (12) || Antonio Osuna (4–1) || David Coggin (0–2) || Rocky Biddle (1) || 17,424 || 29–38
|- style="background:#bfb"
| 68 || June 19 || White Sox || 4–3 || Dan Plesac (2–2) || Rocky Biddle (1–1) || None || 21,905 || 30–38
|- style="background:#fbb"
| 69 || June 20 || White Sox || 1–6 || Mark Buehrle (10–5) || Robert Person (2–4) || None || 22,132 || 30–39
|- style="background:#bfb"
| 70 || June 21 || Twins || 3–0 || Brandon Duckworth (4–4) || Kyle Lohse (6–5) || José Mesa (19) || 17,039 || 31–39
|- style="background:#fbb"
| 71 || June 22 || Twins || 1–4 (11) || LaTroy Hawkins (2–0) || Dan Plesac (2–3) || Eddie Guardado (21) || 18,759 || 31–40
|- style="background:#fbb"
| 72 || June 23 || Twins || 1–5 || Tony Fiore (6–2) || Randy Wolf (3–6) || None || 38,158 || 31–41
|- style="background:#bfb"
| 73 || June 24 || @ Marlins || 15–4 || Vicente Padilla (10–4) || Julián Tavárez (5–4) || None || 5,465 || 32–41
|- style="background:#bfb"
| 74 || June 25 || @ Marlins || 7–6 (11) || José Mesa (2–4) || Vic Darensbourg (1–2) || Dan Plesac (1) || 5,355 || 33–41
|- style="background:#fbb"
| 75 || June 26 || @ Marlins || 2–6 || Michael Tejera (3–1) || Brandon Duckworth (4–5) || None || 6,503 || 33–42
|- style="background:#bfb"
| 76 || June 27 || @ Marlins || 7–3 || Terry Adams (4–5) || Kevin Olsen (0–5) || None || 6,079 || 34–42
|- style="background:#bfb"
| 77 || June 28 || @ Orioles || 6–2 || Randy Wolf (4–6) || Travis Driskill (5–1) || None || 48,937 || 35–42
|- style="background:#fbb"
| 78 || June 29 || @ Orioles || 1–11 || Jason Johnson (3–5) || Vicente Padilla (10–5) || None || 48,692 || 35–43
|- style="background:#bfb"
| 79 || June 30 || @ Orioles || 8–5 || Robert Person (3–4) || Rick Bauer (3–4) || José Mesa (20) || 43,429 || 36–43
|-

|- style="background:#bfb"
| 80 || July 1 || Mets || 6–3 || Brandon Duckworth (5–5) || Shawn Estes (3–6) || José Mesa (21) || 18,422 || 37–43
|- style="background:#fbb"
| 81 || July 2 || Mets || 6–12 || Pedro Astacio (8–3) || Terry Adams (4–6) || None || 20,826 || 37–44
|- style="background:#bfb"
| 82 || July 3 || Mets || 8–7 || Dan Plesac (3–3) || Scott Strickland (6–5) || José Mesa (22) || 50,396 || 38–44
|- style="background:#fbb"
| 83 || July 4 || Expos || 1–2 || Joey Eischen (2–1) || José Mesa (2–5) || Scott Stewart (11) || 12,303 || 38–45
|- style="background:#fbb"
| 84 || July 5 || Expos || 3–8 || Tomo Ohka (8–4) || Robert Person (3–5) || None || 44,143 || 38–46
|- style="background:#fbb"
| 85 || July 6 || Expos || 3–5 || Javier Vázquez (6–5) || Brandon Duckworth (5–6) || Scott Stewart (12) || 15,228 || 38–47
|- style="background:#bfb"
| 86 || July 7 || Expos || 10–8 || Rhéal Cormier (4–4) || Matt Herges (2–3) || José Mesa (23) || 17,393 || 39–47
|- style="background:#bbcaff;"
| – || July 9 ||colspan="7" |2002 Major League Baseball All-Star Game at Miller Park in Milwaukee
|- style="background:#fbb"
| 87 || July 11 || @ Mets || 1–9 || Mark Guthrie (3–0) || Rhéal Cormier (4–5) || None || 32,026 || 39–48
|- style="background:#bfb"
| 88 || July 12 || @ Mets || 9–8 || Robert Person (4–5) || Jeff D'Amico (4–8) || None || 49,424 || 40–48
|- style="background:#bfb"
| 89 || July 13 || @ Mets || 7–6 (12) || Héctor Mercado (2–1) || Scott Strickland (6–6) || Carlos Silva (1) || 51,470 || 41–48
|- style="background:#fbb"
| 90 || July 14 || @ Mets || 2–4 || Pedro Astacio (9–3) || Brandon Duckworth (5–7) || Armando Benítez (21) || 40,463 || 41–49
|- style="background:#bfb"
| 91 || July 15 || @ Expos || 11–8 || David Coggin (1–2) || Matt Herges (2–4) || José Mesa (24) || 11,576 || 42–49
|- style="background:#bfb"
| 92 || July 16 || @ Expos || 6–3 || Randy Wolf (5–6) || Tony Armas Jr. (8–9) || José Mesa (25) || 10,325 || 43–49
|- style="background:#bfb"
| 93 || July 17 || Cubs || 4–3 (10) || José Mesa (3–5) || Jeff Fassero (3–6) || None || 23,541 || 44–49
|- style="background:#fbb"
| 94 || July 18 || Cubs || 4–6 || Matt Clement (8–6) || Vicente Padilla (10–6) || None || 27,672 || 44–50
|- style="background:#fbb"
| 95 || July 19 || Braves || 1–4 || Damian Moss (5–4) || Brandon Duckworth (5–8) || John Smoltz (35) || 20,422 || 44–51
|- style="background:#fbb"
| 96 || July 20 || Braves || 3–4 || Jason Marquis (7–5) || Terry Adams (4–7) || John Smoltz (36) || 23,570 || 44–52
|- style="background:#fbb"
| 97 || July 21 || Braves || 1–2 || Kevin Millwood (9–5) || Randy Wolf (5–7) || Tim Spooneybarger (1) || 25,012 || 44–53
|- style="background:#fbb"
| 98 || July 22 || @ Cubs || 6–7 || Kyle Farnsworth (3–1) || José Mesa (3–6) || None || 29,618 || 44–54
|- style="background:#bfb"
| 99 || July 23 || @ Cubs || 7–4 || David Coggin (2–2) || Matt Clement (8–7) || José Mesa (26) || 32,770 || 45–54
|- style="background:#bfb"
| 100 || July 24 || @ Cubs || 4–2 || Brett Myers (1–0) || Mark Prior (4–3) || José Mesa (27) || 32,697 || 46–54
|- style="background:#bfb"
| 101 || July 25 || @ Cubs || 6–2 || Carlos Silva (2–0) || Kyle Farnsworth (3–2) || None || 34,565 || 47–54
|- style="background:#bfb"
| 102 || July 26 || @ Braves || 3–2 || Randy Wolf (6–7) || Kevin Millwood (9–6) || José Mesa (28) || 44,744 || 48–54
|- style="background:#fbb"
| 103 || July 27 || @ Braves || 3–5 || Greg Maddux (10–3) || Joe Roa (0–1) || John Smoltz (38) || 43,214 || 48–55
|- style="background:#bfb"
| 104 || July 28 || @ Braves || 7–1 || Vicente Padilla (11–6) || Tom Glavine (13–6) || None || 31,764 || 49–55
|- style="background:#fbb"
| 105 || July 30 || Giants || 3–10 || Kirk Rueter (9–6) || Brett Myers (1–1) || None || 27,330 || 49–56
|- style="background:#bfb"
| 106 || July 31 || Giants || 8–6 || Mike Timlin (2–3) || Troy Brohawn (0–1) || José Mesa (29) || 22,595 || 50–56
|-

|- style="background:#bfb"
| 107 || August 1 || Giants || 2–1 || Randy Wolf (7–7) || Russ Ortiz (7–8) || José Mesa (30) || 20,380 || 51–56
|- style="background:#bfb"
| 108 || August 2 || Dodgers || 3–1 || Carlos Silva (3–0) || Paul Quantrill (2–4) || José Mesa (31) || 17,076 || 52–56
|- style="background:#fbb"
| 109 || August 3 || Dodgers || 6–8 (12) || Éric Gagné (1–0) || David Coggin (2–3) || Paul Quantrill (1) || 23,506 || 52–57
|- style="background:#fbb"
| 110 || August 4 || Dodgers || 3–4 || Omar Daal (9–6) || Brett Myers (1–2) || Éric Gagné (36) || 28,186 || 52–58
|- style="background:#bfb"
| 111 || August 5 || Dodgers || 7–5 || Mike Timlin (3–3) || Paul Shuey (3–1) || José Mesa (32) || 20,259 || 53–58
|- style="background:#bfb"
| 112 || August 6 || @ Padres || 5–4 (16) || Rhéal Cormier (5–5) || Bobby J. Jones (7–6) || None || 17,519 || 54–58
|- style="background:#fbb"
| 113 || August 7 || @ Padres || 2–5 || Jake Peavy (3–4) || Vicente Padilla (11–7) || Trevor Hoffman (28) || 18,583 || 54–59
|- style="background:#fbb"
| 114 || August 8 || @ Padres || 4–7 || Tom Davey (1–0) || Terry Adams (4–8) || None || 22,076 || 54–60
|- style="background:#fbb"
| 115 || August 9 || @ Dodgers || 6–7 || Paul Shuey (4–1) || Mike Timlin (3–4) || Éric Gagné (38) || 40,688 || 54–61
|- style="background:#fbb"
| 116 || August 10 || @ Dodgers || 8–10 || Paul Quantrill (3–4) || Rhéal Cormier (5–6) || Éric Gagné (39) || 48,321 || 54–62
|- style="background:#bfb"
| 117 || August 11 || @ Dodgers || 6–3 || Mike Timlin (4–4) || Paul Shuey (4–2) || José Mesa (33) || 38,517 || 55–62
|- style="background:#bfb"
| 118 || August 13 || Brewers || 3–1 || Vicente Padilla (12–7) || Glendon Rusch (6–12) || José Mesa (34) || 14,046 || 56–62
|- style="background:#bfb"
| 119 || August 14 || Brewers || 4–1 || Brett Myers (2–2) || Jamey Wright (4–12) || None || 14,509 || 57–62
|- style="background:#bfb"
| 120 || August 15 || Brewers || 5–1 || Joe Roa (1–1) || Rubén Quevedo (6–11) || None || 14,288 || 58–62
|- style="background:#bfb"
| 121 || August 16 || Cardinals || 4–0 || Randy Wolf (8–7) || Chuck Finley (7–14) || None || 31,117 || 59–62
|- style="background:#fbb"
| 122 || August 17 || Cardinals || 1–5 || Jason Simontacchi (9–4) || David Coggin (2–4) || None || 20,242 || 59–63
|- style="background:#fbb"
| 123 || August 18 || Cardinals || 1–5 || Matt Morris (15–7) || Vicente Padilla (12–8) || None || 58,493 || 59–64
|- style="background:#fbb"
| 124 || August 20 || @ Brewers || 1–2 || Jamey Wright (5–12) || Brett Myers (2–3) || Mike DeJean (20) || 24,082 || 59–65
|- style="background:#bfb"
| 125 || August 21 || @ Brewers || 13–3 || Joe Roa (2–1) || Ben Sheets (7–15) || None || 21,250 || 60–65
|- style="background:#bfb"
| 126 || August 22 || @ Brewers || 7–0 || Randy Wolf (9–7) || Jimmy Osting (0–1) || None || 18,150 || 61–65
|- style="background:#bfb"
| 127 || August 23 || @ Cardinals || 5–4 (14) || Terry Adams (5–8) || Kevin Joseph (0–1) || None || 35,724 || 62–65
|- style="background:#bfb"
| 128 || August 24 || @ Cardinals || 4–0 || Vicente Padilla (13–8) || Andy Benes (3–4) || José Mesa (35) || 41,033 || 63–65
|- style="background:#bfb"
| 129 || August 25 || @ Cardinals || 5–3 || Carlos Silva (4–0) || Jason Isringhausen (2–2) || José Mesa (36) || 31,850 || 64–65
|- style="background:#bfb"
| 130 || August 27 || Expos || 4–2 || Joe Roa (3–1) || Masato Yoshii (4–6) || José Mesa (37) || 16,126 || 65–65
|- style="background:#fbb"
| 131 || August 28 || Expos || 3–6 || Tomo Ohka (12–6) || David Coggin (2–5) || None || 13,821 || 65–66
|- style="background:#bfb"
| 132 || August 29 || Expos || 2–1 || Brandon Duckworth (6–8) || Bartolo Colón (17–7) || José Mesa (38) || 14,268 || 66–66
|- style="background:#bfb"
| 133 || August 30 || @ Mets || 7–5 || Vicente Padilla (14–8) || Pedro Astacio (11–8) || José Mesa (39) || 30,976 || 67–66
|- style="background:#bfb"
| 134 || August 31 || @ Mets || 1–0 || Randy Wolf (10–7) || Steve Trachsel (8–10) || None || 30,733 || 68–66
|-

|- style="background:#bfb"
| 135 || September 1 || @ Mets || 9–5 || Brett Myers (3–3) || Al Leiter (11–11) || None || 28,781 || 69–66
|- style="background:#fbb"
| 136 || September 2 || @ Expos || 1–5 || Tomo Ohka (13–6) || Joe Roa (3–2) || None || 5,723 || 69–67
|- style="background:#fbb"
| 137 || September 3 || @ Expos || 6–7 (10) || Joey Eischen (4–1) || Terry Adams (5–9) || None || 5,723 || 69–68
|- style="background:#fbb"
| 138 || September 4 || @ Expos || 5–8 || Tony Armas Jr. (9–12) || Vicente Padilla (14–9) || Joey Eischen (2) || 5,723 || 69–69
|- style="background:#bfb"
| 139 || September 5 || @ Expos || 4–1 || Randy Wolf (11–7) || Javier Vázquez (8–13) || None || 2,134 || 70–69
|- style="background:#fbb"
| 140 || September 6 || Mets || 2–7 || Al Leiter (12–11) || Brett Myers (3–4) || None || 16,335 || 70–70
|- style="background:#fbb"
| 141 || September 7 || Mets || 4–5 || Tyler Walker (1–0) || Joe Roa (3–3) || Armando Benítez (31) || 21,747 || 70–71
|- style="background:#fbb"
| 142 || September 8 || Mets || 3–11 || John Thomson (9–11) || Brandon Duckworth (6–9) || None || 20,047 || 70–72
|- style="background:#fbb"
| 143 || September 9 || Mets || 4–6 || Jeff D'Amico (6–10) || Mike Timlin (4–5) || Armando Benítez (32) || 13,514 || 70–73
|- style="background:#fbb"
| 144 || September 10 (1) || Marlins || 4–6 || Graeme Lloyd (4–4) || Randy Wolf (11–8) || Armando Almanza (2) || see 2nd game || 70–74
|- style="background:#fbb"
| 145 || September 10 (2) || Marlins || 1–2 || Justin Wayne (1–1) || Vicente Padilla (14–10) || Braden Looper (10) || 14,345 || 70–75
|- style="background:#bfb"
| 146 || September 11 || Marlins || 9–2 || Brett Myers (4–4) || Brad Penny (6–6) || None || 12,274 || 71–75
|- style="background:#bfb"
| 147 || September 12 || Marlins || 6–1 || Joe Roa (4–3) || Michael Tejera (8–8) || None || 13,167 || 72–75
|- style="background:#fbb"
| 148 || September 13 || Pirates || 3–5 || Joe Beimel (2–5) || Mike Timlin (4–6) || Mike Williams (42) || 13,718 || 72–76
|- style="background:#bfb"
| 149 || September 14 || Pirates || 4–1 || Eric Junge (1–0) || Brian Meadows (1–6) || José Mesa (40) || 16,621 || 73–76
|- style="background:#bfb"
| 150 || September 15 || Pirates || 1–0 (10) || José Mesa (4–6) || Scott Sauerbeck (3–3) || None || 23,054 || 74–76
|- style="background:#fbb"
| 151 || September 17 || @ Braves || 1–2 || Greg Maddux (14–6) || Vicente Padilla (14–11) || John Smoltz (52) || 23,082 || 74–77
|- style="background:#bfb"
| 152 || September 18 || @ Braves || 6–5 || Carlos Silva (5–0) || Kerry Ligtenberg (3–4) || José Mesa (41) || 20,356 || 75–77
|- style="background:#fbb"
| 153 || September 19 || @ Braves || 0–6 || Tom Glavine (18–10) || Joe Roa (4–4) || None || 23,482 || 75–78
|- style="background:#bbb"
| – || September 20 || @ Reds || colspan=6 | Postponed (rain); Makeup: September 21 as a day-night double-header
|- style="background:#bfb"
| 154 || September 21 (1) || @ Reds || 5–3 (10) || Terry Adams (6–9) || Scott Williamson (3–4) || José Mesa (42) || 36,940 || 76–78
|- style="background:#bfb"
| 155 || September 21 (2) || @ Reds || 5–4 (11) || Terry Adams (7–9) || Joey Hamilton (4–10) || José Mesa (43) || 40,804 || 77–78
|- style="background:#bfb"
| 156 || September 22 || @ Reds || 4–3 || Brandon Duckworth (7–9) || José Rijo (5–4) || José Mesa (44) || 40,964 || 78–78
|- style="background:#bfb"
| 157 || September 24 || Braves || 5–3 || Eric Junge (2–0) || Tom Glavine (18–11) || José Mesa (45) || 15,807 || 79–78
|- style="background:#fbb"
| 158 || September 25 || Braves || 1–7 || Damian Moss (12–6) || Brett Myers (4–5) || None || 14,516 || 79–79
|- style="background:#bbb"
| – || September 26 || Braves || colspan=6 | Cancelled (rain; Hurricane Isidore); Will not be rescheduled
|- style="background:#fbb"
| 159 || September 27 || @ Marlins || 2–5 || Gary Knotts (3–1) || Randy Wolf (11–9) || Braden Looper (13) || 8,689 || 79–80
|- style="background:#bfb"
| 160 || September 28 || @ Marlins || 9–3 || Brandon Duckworth (8–9) || Justin Wayne (2–3) || None || 11,746 || 80–80
|- style="background:#fbb"
| 161 || September 29 || @ Marlins || 3–4 (10) || Braden Looper (2–5) || Héctor Mercado (2–2) || None || 28,599 || 80–81
|- 
|-

Roster

Player stats

Batting

Starters by position
Note: Pos = Position; G = Games played; AB = At bats; H = Hits; Avg. = Batting average; HR = Home runs; RBI = Runs batted in

Other batters
Note: G = Games played; AB = At bats; H = Hits; Avg. = Batting average; HR = Home runs; RBI = Runs batted in

Note: Pitchers' hitting stats are not included above.

Pitching

Starting pitchers
Note: G = Games pitched; IP = Innings pitched; W = Wins; L = Losses; ERA = Earned run average; SO = Strikeouts

Other pitchers
Note: G = Games pitched; IP = Innings pitched; W = Wins; L = Losses; ERA = Earned run average; SO = Strikeouts

Relief pitchers
Note: G = Games pitched; W = Wins; L = Losses; SV = Saves; ERA = Earned run average; SO = Strikeouts

Awards and honors2002 Major League Baseball All-Star Game'''
Jimmy Rollins, shortstop, starter
Scott Rolen, third base, starter
Vicente Padilla, pitcher, reserve

Farm system 

LEAGUE CHAMPIONS: GCL Phillies

References

External links
2002 Philadelphia Phillies season at Baseball Reference

Philadelphia Phillies seasons
Philadelphia Phillies season
Philadelphia Phillies
2002 in Philadelphia